Southwark Town Hall may refer to:

Walworth Town Hall, referred to as Southwark Town Hall before 1965
Camberwell Town Hall, London, referred to as Southwark Town Hall from 1965 to 2009
160 Tooley Street, the home of Southwark Council since 2009